Alena Kánová (born 29 March 1980) is a Slovak table tennis player who has played at the Summer Paralympics for her country, winning gold at the 2000 Summer Paralympics, and silver at the 2020 Summer Paralympics. She also competed at the 2014 Winter Paralympics in wheelchair curling.

Career
Alena Kánová was born on 29 March 1980 in Liptovský Mikuláš, Slovakia. At the age of 14, she was paralysed following a road accident and has been confined to a wheelchair since. After the accident, she attended the Slovakian National Rehabilitation Center for a year, before returning to school. She tried several sports, but focused on table tennis as she had a table at home on which she could practice.

Kánová competed in her first Summer Paralympics at the 2000 Games in Sydney, Australia, where she won the gold medal in the individual class 3 tournament. She continued to compete at successive Paralympic Games, winning a bronze in 2004 in Athens, Greece, and a silver at the Beijing Games in 2008. Her most recent medal came at the 2012 Summer Paralympics, when she defeated Welsh athlete Sara Head in the bronze medal match and won her nation's first medal of the competition. She does not keep her Paralympic medals, instead giving them away to those who have helped her compete.

Outside of table tennis, she also competes in wheelchair curling, making the Paralympic team for the Winter Paralympics in 2014 in Sochi, Russia.

Wheelchair curling teams and events

References

External links

Profile at the 2014 Winter Paralympics site (web archive)

Living people
1980 births
Sportspeople from Liptovský Mikuláš
Table tennis players at the 2000 Summer Paralympics
Table tennis players at the 2004 Summer Paralympics
Table tennis players at the 2008 Summer Paralympics
Table tennis players at the 2012 Summer Paralympics
Table tennis players at the 2016 Summer Paralympics
Wheelchair curlers at the 2014 Winter Paralympics
Wheelchair curlers at the 2022 Winter Paralympics
Paralympic gold medalists for Slovakia
Paralympic silver medalists for Slovakia
Paralympic bronze medalists for Slovakia
Medalists at the 2000 Summer Paralympics
Medalists at the 2004 Summer Paralympics
Medalists at the 2008 Summer Paralympics
Medalists at the 2012 Summer Paralympics
Paralympic medalists in table tennis
Slovak female curlers
Slovak wheelchair curlers
Paralympic wheelchair curlers of Slovakia
Paralympic table tennis players of Slovakia
Table tennis players at the 2020 Summer Paralympics
People with paraplegia
Slovak female table tennis players